Japan Anthropology Workshop (JAWS) is an international academic association concerned with furthering the field of anthropology of Japan. JAWS holds major conferences – some in conjunction with the European Association for Japanese Studies (EAJS) – as well as smaller workshops and seminars. It runs a website and issues a newsletter. JAWS publishes selected works on Japan anthropology in partnership with Routledge. 

The first conference was organised in Oxford in March 1984. It is now a conference held approximately every 18 months, organised with hosts across the world.

History
The Japan Anthropology Workshop developed out of a growing international interest in the anthropology of Japan, both for from anthropologists looking at Japan as a country which may have a contribution to make to their own specialist field, and from scholars already specialising in Japanese studies who increasingly appreciate the insights that an anthropological approach can bring to their work. The idea for JAWS was conceived at the 1982 European Association of Japanese Studies (EAJS) Conference in The Hague, after which  a planning meeting was organised the following year at the Nissan Institute for Japanese Studies in Oxford. The first workshop was held in March 1984 when a need was identified for a forum for the growing but largely isolated band of anthropologists of Japan to meet together and exchange ideas. It was here that JAWS was officially founded.

Conferences
An overview of the JAWS conferences from 2005.

References

Japanese studies
Anthropology

External links
 JAWS Website
 JAWS Routledge Series Webpage